Sacred Heart Catholic Church is a historic Roman Catholic church on Church Street in Loretto, Tennessee.

The congregation was formed in 1871 by Catholics of German ancestry who had come from the Cincinnati area to settle in Lawrence County, Tennessee. The first priest was J. H. Hueser, who had been sent to Tennessee from Indiana in 1869 to become the first priest in Lawrence County. The parish residence that he built in 1871 was used for Mass from October 1871 to February 1872, while a new frame building was being built to serve as a combined church and school. The church's current brick building replaced that first church. It was started in 1910 and dedicated in May 1912. In 1984 it was added to the National Register of Historic Places.

References

External links
 Sacred Heart website

Roman Catholic churches in Tennessee
Churches on the National Register of Historic Places in Tennessee
Gothic Revival church buildings in Tennessee
Roman Catholic churches completed in 1911
Buildings and structures in Lawrence County, Tennessee
National Register of Historic Places in Lawrence County, Tennessee
20th-century Roman Catholic church buildings in the United States